Nichole "Nicci" Gilbert (born July 8, 1970) is an American R&B singer. She is mainly known for being the former lead vocalist of an American female R&B girl-group Brownstone who rose to fame in the mid 1990s best known for their 1995 hit single "If You Love Me", which was nominated for a Best R&B Performance Grammy Award. "Grapevyne" and "Pass the Lovin'" also brought them some success, as well as their rendition of "I Can't Tell You Why", a song originally recorded by The Eagles.

Following the disbandment of the group in 1997, saw Gilbert's theatrical film debut in Woo (1998). Gilbert returned to the music industry after a five-year hiatus as a solo singer and released her debut album Grown Folks Music (2003) through MCA Records.

In 2012, she starred as a cast member and executive producer in the TV One's R&B Divas: Atlanta, which features the lives of five 1990s chart-topping R&B singers. She was featured in 2 seasons of the show. She also performed with the group at events such as Essence Music Festival.

Early life
Nicci Gilbert was born as Nicole Gilbert on July 8, 1970 in Detroit, Michigan, United States to African-American parents. Gilbert grew up in Detroit, where her mother Helene was a jazz singer. Gilbert's mom did a lot to encourage her interest in music, and when she was in high school, Gilbert performed Madonna's "Crazy for You" in a talent show.

After graduating from high school, Gilbert studied music and drama at Eastern Michigan University. But she ended up dropping out after two years so that she could move to L.A. with a friend and be closer to the music industry. It was a risky move, but one that eventually paid off for her. At first, Gilbert struggled in L.A., where she appeared in various talent shows while paying her bills with non-musical "day gigs" (including a job at Taco Bell). But things started to pick up for Gilbert when, in 1993, she formed Brownstone's original lineup with Monica Doby and Charmayne Maxwell.

Career

1993–1997: Brownstone

In 1994, Brownstone signed with R&B/pop superstar Michael Jackson's MJJ Music, which was distributed by Epic Records and Sony Records. Their debut "Pass the Lovin" was released in the United States on August 2, 1994. The song failed to make impact on the Billboard Hot 100, however the single peaked at number fifty-eight on the Hot R&B/Hip-Hop Songs chart and number forty-two on the Hot Dance Club Songs chart. Their debut album From the Bottom Up was released on January 10, 1995 and reached its peak at number twenty-nine on the Billboard Hot 200 chart. Their next single, If You Love Me, became a smash hit charting at number eight on the Billboard Hot 100 and number two on the Hot R&B/Hip-Hop Songs Chart in the United States. Grapevyne and I Can't Tell You Why were released as the third and fourth single from album but weren't successful as "If You Love Me" charting at numbers forty-nine and fifty-four on the Billboard Hot 100. From the Bottom Up also contained Brownstone's hit remake of the Eagles' "I Can't Tell You Why," which was originally a pop/rock tune but received an urban contemporary makeover from Gilbert and her colleagues.

Band member Monica Doby left the group due to internal strife with Gilbert and she was replaced by Kina Cosper. In 1997, Brownstone unveiled their new lineup on the trio's second album Still Climbing released on June 24, 1997, which turned out to be their final album. The album was preceded by two singles "5 Miles to Empty" and "Kiss and Tell" to promote the album. "5 Miles to Empty" peaked at number thirty-nine on the Billboard Hot 100 but the second single failed to chart on the Hot 100. Much to the disappointment of Brownstone's fans, the group broke up that year.

1996–1998: TV acting career and Film debut
In 1996, Gilbert branched out into acting and having roles on various television programs including Martin and Living Single. She appeared on the Fox hit show Martin as "Alesha" in the episode "Martin, I Want to Sing" and as "Helen Robinson" on Living Single in the episode "School's Out Forever".

In 1998, Gilbert appeared on Sister, Sister as Nurse Shelley in the episode "In Sickness and Health". Months later, Gilbert made her theatrical film debut in romantic comedy Woo as Crayola. The film was met with very negative reviews from audiences and critics.

2002–2005: Return to Music, Debut album and Stage Debut
After taking a five-year hiatus Gilbert returned to the music industry signed with MCA Records in 2002. "My Side of the Story" was released as the lead single from the album "Grown Folk Music" impacting radio on October 28, 2002. In 2003, the label became defunct. During an interview in 2011 with You Know I Got Soul when asked about her album Gilbert states "this was around the time where things pretty much ended for MCA. I asked for my masters and they gave them to me. I own the masters to the album and it's available on iTunes." The album was later released on March 8, 2005 but failed to make impact on charts in the United States.

In 2004, Gilbert starred in Tyler Perry's stage play Meet the Browns as Vera Brown. It was released to DVD through Lionsgate on June 28, 2005.

2010– Present: Soul Kittens Cabaret, R&B Divas Atlanta, From The Bottom Up and New Music
On October 11, 2010, a trailer for the stage musical "Soul Kittens Cabaret" directed by Gilbert, was released to YouTube via American Technologies. The musical features R&B singers Faith Evans, Fantasia Barrino, Monifah, Syleena Johnson and Gilbert. It was released to DVD on January 11, 2011.

In 2012, she executive produced TV One's R&B Divas, whereas she was cast alongside singers Faith Evans, Keke Wyatt, Monifah, and Syleena Johnson. The show documents the singers living in Atlanta, Georgia as they work towards rebuilding their careers. Gilbert appeared on the show for seasons one and two, becoming one of the more notable and controversial figures on the show. The first episode aired on August 20, 2012. Throughout the show, R&B Divas singers collaborated on a charity album commemorating the life of Whitney Houston, featuring the single "Love Yourself" which is also featured in the TV show's introduction.  Proceeds of the album went towards benefiting organizations committed to improving the lives of women. In 2015, she partnered with Queen Latifah to produce a series for BET Networks called "From The Bottom Up" a series she created and executive produced for two seasons in 2015 to present.

On April 7, 2017, Gilbert released a single called "Fly" through Brownstone Records.

In July 2022, Gilbert became a honorary inductee into Sigma Gamma Rho sorority.

Discography

Albums
 Grown Folks Music (2005)

Filmography

Films

Television

Plays

References

External links
 
 

1970 births
African-American women singer-songwriters
African-American Christians
American gospel musicians
American soul singers
American rhythm and blues singer-songwriters
African-American actresses
American film actresses
American musical theatre actresses
American television actresses
Living people
Musicians from Detroit
TVT Records artists
American contemporary R&B singers
20th-century American actresses
21st-century American actresses
20th-century African-American women singers
21st-century African-American women singers
Singer-songwriters from Michigan